Counting to Zero is the ninth studio album by Collide, released on May 25, 2017 by Noiseplus Music.

Reception
Chain D.L.K. commended Counting to Zero called it "bigger, bolder and heavier album than they've ever done before." ReGen said "with Color of Nothing, the band has achieved a bold new standard of darkly melodic songwriting coupled with a truly industrialized rock aesthetic that we’ve rarely heard since the advent of '90s coldwave" and that they "return with some of the richest and most rocking songs they have yet produced, making for an excellent entry in the Collide discography."

Track listing

Personnel
Adapted from the Color of Nothing liner notes.

Collide
 Eric Anest (as Statik) – keyboards, sequencer, cover art, illustrations, design
 Karin Johnston (as kaRIN) – vocals

Release history

References

External links 
 Color of Nothing at collide.net
 
 Color of Nothing at Bandcamp
 Color of Nothing at iTunes

Collide (band) albums
2017 albums